Indira Gandhi Rajkiya Mahila Mahavidyalaya, also spelled as Indra Gandhi Rajkeeya Mahila Mahavidyalaya is a government women's college in Raebareli, Uttar Pradesh, established in 1993. 
It is affiliated to University of Lucknow.

References

Universities and colleges in Raebareli
Women's universities and colleges in Uttar Pradesh
1993 establishments in Uttar Pradesh
Educational institutions established in 1993